Maksym Serhiyovych Zaderaka (born 7 September 1994) is a Ukrainian professional footballer who plays as a midfielder for Kryvbas Kryvyi Rih.

Career
Zaderaka is a product of the youth team systems of Oleksandriya (first coach was Valeriy Kurhanov). He signed a contract with Metalurh Donetsk in 2010. He made his debut for Metalurh Donetsk in a game against Dnipro Dnipropetrovsk on 25 July 2014 in the Ukrainian Premier League.

References

External links
 
 
 

1994 births
Living people
People from Oleksandriia
Ukrainian footballers
Ukraine youth international footballers
Association football midfielders
FC Metalurh Donetsk players
FC Stal Kamianske players
FC Oleksandriya players
FC Ararat Yerevan players
FC Metalist 1925 Kharkiv players
FC Kryvbas Kryvyi Rih players
Ukrainian Premier League players
Armenian Premier League players
Ukrainian expatriate footballers
Expatriate footballers in Armenia
Ukrainian expatriate sportspeople in Armenia